Jaromír Šlégr (born 19 September 1941) is a Czech sprinter. He competed in the men's 4 × 400 metres relay at the 1960 Summer Olympics.

References

1941 births
Living people
Athletes (track and field) at the 1960 Summer Olympics
Czech male sprinters
Czech male middle-distance runners
Olympic athletes of Czechoslovakia
Place of birth missing (living people)